Essam Hamad Salem (born 22 October 1973) is an Iraqi football coach and former player.

He played as a midfielder for Iraq in the 2000 Asian Cup. Essam also played for Al-Karkh, Al-Taawun, and Al-Zawraa at club level.

Club level 
Hamad won the double (league and cup) twice, with Al-Zawraa in the 1994–95 and 1995–96 seasons.

International career 
Having already played for the Iraq Olympic team at the qualifiers for the 1996 Summer Olympics, Hamad began playing for the senior team in 1995. He was a regular at the 1996 AFC Asian Cup and 2000 AFC Asian Cup.

Hamad was selected to play for an Asian all-star team in 2000 by the AFC in Tehran, Iran, to commemorate the founding of the Islamic Republic of Iran. He captained the side in the second half. The all-star team was beaten 5–0 by Iran.

Career statistics

International
Scores and results list Iraq's goal tally first.

Managerial

Honours

Manager
Al-Zawraa
 Iraq FA Cup: 2017
 Iraqi Super Cup: 2021

References

External links
 
 

1973 births
Living people
Iraqi footballers
Association football midfielders
Al-Karkh SC players
Al-Zawraa SC players
Al-Khor SC players
Al Ahli Saida SC players
Tishreen SC players
Shabab Al Sahel FC players
Al-Yarmouk FC (Jordan) players
Iraqi Premier League players
Qatar Stars League players
Lebanese Premier League players
Syrian Premier League players
Jordanian Pro League players
Iraq youth international footballers
Iraq international footballers
1996 AFC Asian Cup players
2000 AFC Asian Cup players
Iraqi football managers
Al-Zawraa SC managers
Al-Karkh SC managers
Zakho FC managers
Al-Talaba SC managers
Amanat Baghdad SC managers
Iraqi Premier League managers
Iraqi expatriate footballers
Iraqi expatriate sportspeople in Qatar
Iraqi expatriate sportspeople in Lebanon
Iraqi expatriate sportspeople in Syria
Iraqi expatriate sportspeople in Jordan
Expatriate footballers in Qatar
Expatriate footballers in Lebanon
Expatriate footballers in Syria
Expatriate footballers in Jordan